Sadun Aren (19 March 1922 – 8 March 2008) was a Turkish academic and politician. He was one of the cofounders of Workers' Party of Turkey and of the leading figures of socialist movement in Turkey.

Early life and education
Aren was born on 19 March 1922 in Erzurum. His father was a civil servant, and his mother was a housewife who died when Sadun Aren was a child. Due to his father's frequent appointments he completed his primary and secondary education in different cities, including Eskişehir, Ankara and Istanbul. He graduated from Ankara University's Faculty of Political Science in 1944. He held a PhD which he received from the same university.

Career and arrests
Following the completion of his PhD studies Aren began to work at the Faculty of Political Science, Ankara University, as an associate professor and taught courses in sociology. In 1951 he was sent to Geneva to work at the United Nations' European Economic Commission. However, he resigned from the office and began to work at BBC's Turkish section. He returned to Turkey in 1956, but was arrested for a short time due to his communist activities. He became full professor in 1957 at the Faculty of Political Science, Ankara University. Following the military coup on 27 May 1960 Aren was appointed to the economic committee of the military government. In 1961 he involved in the establishment of the Workers' Party of Turkey and became the head of Ankara branch of the party in 1962. Aren won a seat in the Parliament for the party representing Istanbul in 1965. Within the party Aren and Behice Boran formed an alliance. They both resigned from the party in 1968 due to his opposition against the views of Mehmet Ali Aybar who headed the Workers' Party. Aybar did not support the invasion of Czechoslovakia by the Soviet Union in August 1968 and argued that a non-authoritarian and democratic version of socialism was needed in Turkey.

Immediately after the military coup on 12 March 1971 Aren was arrested and imprisoned for three years in Niğde. He was not allowed to continue his academic work at the university and began to work as an advisor to a trade union, DİSK. He was also imprisoned one year after the military coup on 12 September 1980 and released in 1984.

Aren founded a political party, Socialist Unity Party, in 1991. Following the dissolution of the party he joined Freedom and Solidarity Party and was made the party's honorary chair.

Personal life and death
Aren married to Munise Hanım on 25 October 1949 with whom he had two children, a daughter and a son. He died in Ankara on 8 March 2008 and buried there on 10 March.

Works and views
Aren is the writer of several books. He published several articles in the newspapers and magazines, including Yön, Emek, Marksizm ve Gelecek and Politika.

When Aren was a member of the Workers' Party he claimed that the focus should not be exclusively on the theory. He also argued that the clash between socialism and capitalism should be nonviolent due to the changing nature of the economy and that discussions which led to polemics were not useful. Although Aren also did not support the Soviet invasion of Czechoslovia like Mehmet Ali Aybar, he was an ardent critic of Aybar's conceptualization of democratic socialism. Aren considered statism as an ideological tool to mobilize the masses.

References

20th-century scholars
20th-century Turkish politicians
21st-century Turkish politicians
1922 births
2008 deaths
Ankara University Faculty of Political Sciences alumni
Academic staff of Ankara University
Deputies of Istanbul
Turkish communists
Turkish political party founders
Turkish political scientists
Turkish prisoners and detainees
Turkish social scientists
Workers' Party of Turkey politicians
20th-century political scientists